The 4th IAAF World Cup in Athletics was an international track and field sporting event sponsored by the International Association of Athletics Federations, held on October 4–6, 1985, at the Bruce Stadium in Canberra, Australia.

Overall results

Medal summary

Men

Women

External links
World Cup Results
Full Results by IAAF

IAAF Continental Cup
World Cup
IAAF World Cup
World Cup
Sports competitions in Canberra
1980s in Canberra
October 1985 sports events in Australia